Jameyel Johnson, (born September 3, 1984) better known by his stage name J. Dash, is an American rapper, record producer and songwriter, born in Atlanta, Georgia.

Life and career
Raised in the American South, J. Dash went to Stanton College Preparatory School and played in the school band. He has a bachelor's degree from the University of Florida. His first approach to music was at the age of 5, when he learned to play piano by ear. At age 12 he was in a blues band, and later played keyboards in the Fusebox Funk band.

J. Dash's single, "Wop", reached the no. 1 position on the Billboard Heatseekers Songs chart on April 13, 2013. The song is prominently featured in Céline Sciamma's 2014 film Girlhood.

Dash is known to be a TuneCore user, through which he distributes his own music.

He hosted the Make Music Day Bedroom Studios event on June 21, 2020, from Austin, Texas.

Discography

References

External links
 

African-American male rappers
American male singers
American hip hop record producers
Rappers from Florida
Living people
Southern hip hop musicians
1984 births
21st-century American rappers
21st-century American male musicians
21st-century African-American musicians
20th-century African-American people